Laurence Pithie (born 17 July 2002) is a New Zealand professional racing cyclist, who currently rides for UCI WorldTeam .

Pithie attended Christchurch Boys' High School from 2016 to 2020.

Career
As a 17-year-old Pithie won two gold medals at the UCI Junior World Championships in the Madison and Omnium.
In 2019 Pithie won the national criterium champs allowing him to wear the national jersey in all criteriums for that year.
Pithie started the 2021 season off with top 10's in the sprint stages at the New Zealand Cycle Classic. Then fourth in Slovenia after leading out teammate Marijn van den Berg to victory. He finally nabbed a podium in the Circuit de Wallonie behind winner Christophe Laporte. He held his form to the Tour de la Mirabelle where a second place in the reduced bunch finish of Stage 2 brought him to seventh overall. Pithie's greatest accomplishment came at the Baltic Chain Tour where he finished 2nd in every stage which allowed him to win Overall.

Major results

Road

2019
 1st  Criterium, National Championships
 2nd  Time trial, Oceania Junior Championships
2021
 1st  Overall Baltic Chain Tour
1st  Points classification
1st  Youth classification
 1st Stage 1 (TTT) New Zealand Cycle Classic
 3rd Circuit de Wallonie
 4th GP Adria Mobil
 7th Overall Tour de la Mirabelle
2022
 National Championships
1st  Under-23 Road race
2nd Under-23 Time trial
3rd Road race
 1st Grand Prix de la ville de Pérenchies
 1st Stage 3 Tour de Normandie
 3rd Overall New Zealand Cycle Classic
1st  Youth classification
 3rd Trofeo Bonin Costruzioni
 8th Grote Prijs Jean-Pierre Monseré
 10th Paris–Troyes
2023
 1st Cholet-Pays de la Loire
 2nd Classic Loire Atlantique
 8th Nokere Koerse

Track

2019
 UCI World Junior Championships
1st  Omnium
1st  Madison (with Kiaan Watts)
 National Junior Championships 
1st  Omnium
3rd Team pursuit
3rd Kiko
 1st  Individual pursuit, Oceania Junior Championships
2020
 National Championships 
1st  Team pursuit
1st  Madison (with Thomas Sexton)

References

External links

2002 births
Living people
New Zealand male cyclists
People from Christchurch
21st-century New Zealand people